LY-215,840 is an ergoline derivative drug developed by Eli Lilly, which acts as a potent and selective antagonist at the serotonin 5-HT2 and 5-HT7 receptors. It has anti-hypertensive and muscle relaxant effects in animal studies.

References

5-HT2 antagonists
Cyclopentanes
Ergolines
Eli Lilly and Company brands